Tomasz Bednarek and Mateusz Kowalczyk were the two-time defending champions, but Bednarek did not participate that year. Kowalczyk played alongside Artem Sitak and they lost in the First Round to Adil Shamasdin and Franko Škugor.

Andreas Siljeström and Igor Zelenay won the title, defeating Rameez Junaid and Michal Mertiňák in the final, 7–5, 6–4.

Seeds

  Robert Farah /  Philipp Oswald (first round)
  Gero Kretschmer /  Alexander Satschko (first round)
  Rameez Junaid /  Michal Mertiňák (final)
  Mateusz Kowalczyk /  Artem Sitak (first round)

Draw

Draw

References
 Main Draw

Sparkassen Open - Doubles
2014 Doubles